Paularo is a comune (municipality) in the Province of Udine in the Italian region Friuli-Venezia Giulia, located about  northwest of Trieste and about  north of Udine, on the border with Austria.

Paularo borders the following municipalities: Arta Terme, Dellach im Gailtal (Austria), Hermagor-Pressegger See (Austria), Kirchbach (Austria), Kötschach-Mauthen (Austria), Moggio Udinese, Paluzza, Treppo Ligosullo.

Twin towns
Paularo is twinned with:

  Sillingy, France, since 2000
  Kirchbach, Austria, since 2003
  Bucine, Italy, since 2009

References

Cities and towns in Friuli-Venezia Giulia